Svobodny was one of 18 s (officially known as Project 7U) built for the Soviet Navy during the late 1930s. Although she began construction as a Project 7 , Svobodny was completed in early 1942 to the modified Project 7U design.

Still incomplete when Operation Barbarossa, the German invasion of the Soviet Union, began in June 1941, she had to be moved twice to prevent her capture by the Germans. Once completed, the destroyer began to transport supplies and troops into besieged Sevastopol and to provide naval gunfire support for the defenders of the city and Soviet troops in the Battle of the Kerch Peninsula. While moored there in early June, Svobodny sank after being struck by German bombs with the loss of 67 crewmen. Her wreck was refloated and scrapped in 1953.

Design and description 

Originally built as a Gnevny-class ship, Svobodny and her sister ships were completed to the modified Project 7U design after Joseph Stalin, General Secretary of the Communist Party of the Soviet Union, ordered that the latter be built with their boilers arranged en echelon, instead of linked as in the Gnevnys, so that a ship could still move with one or two boilers disabled.

The crew complement of the Storozhevoy class numbered 207 in peacetime, but this increased to 271 in wartime, as more personnel were needed to operate additional equipment. Each ship had a pair of geared steam turbines, each driving one propeller, rated to produce  using steam from four water-tube boilers, which the designers expected would exceed the  speed of the Project 7s because there was additional steam available.

The Project 7U-class ships mounted four  B-13 guns in two pairs of superfiring single mounts fore and aft of the superstructure. Anti-aircraft defense was provided by a pair of  34-K AA guns in single mounts and three  21-K AA guns, as well as four  DK or DShK machine guns. They carried six  torpedo tubes in two rotating triple mounts amidships. The ships could also carry a maximum of 58 to 96 mines and 30 depth charges. Due to her late completion, Svobodny was equipped with Soyuz-7U anti-aircraft fire control, uniquely among the Black Sea Fleet ships of her class.

Construction and career 
Svobodny was laid down at Shipyard No. 200 (named after 61 Communards) in Nikolayev with the yard number 1074 on 23 August 1936 as a Gnevny-class destroyer with the name Besshumny. She was relaid down as a Project 7U destroyer in 1938 at Shipyard No. 201 (Sergo Ordzhonikidze) in Sevastopol as yard number 246 and launched on 25 February 1939. The ship was renamed Svobodny on 25 September 1940 and was 83.8% complete when the Germans invaded the Soviet Union on 22 June 1941. To prevent her capture by the advancing German forces, the still-incomplete destroyer was towed to Sevastopol on 9 August without completing mooring trials and then to Poti, Georgia, on 2 November. Svobodny was accepted on 2 January 1942, and joined the Black Sea Fleet a week later.

She began ferrying supplies and personnel into besieged Sevastopol shortly afterwards, in addition to service as a convoy escort. The ship also bombarded German positions with 22 shells from her main guns on 18 January before beginning a brief refit in February. Svobodny resumed her previous duties and bombarded Axis positions on the coast of Feodosia Gulf on the night of 16 March. She fired 90 shells at German troops near Feodosia on 20 March and a total of 82 more shells on 2 and 10 April in support of Soviet troops during the Battle of the Kerch Peninsula. She towed the old destroyer , disabled by an accident, to Tuapse on 22 March. The destroyer fired 106 shells at Axis troops advancing on Sevastopol on 4 April.  The ship was refitted again through early May. Resuming transport missions between Sevastopol and Caucasian ports, Svobodny, her sister , and the cruiser  ferried the 9th Naval Infantry Brigade from Batumi to Sevastopol between 27 and 28 May. During this sortie, Svobodny claimed to have downed one of the two Heinkel He 111 bombers shot down.

Svobodny departed from Novorossiysk as an escort for the transport Abkhaziya on 9 June, and was attacked by German bombers from II./KG 26 that night, although the two dozen torpedoes dropped by the latter missed. Both ships moored in Severnaya Bay in Sevastopol on the night of 9–10 June, where the destroyer finished unloading ammunition destined for the garrison by 04:30 on 10 June. She then bombarded German positions in the Mekenziev mountains, firing 400 shells, and was soon targeted by German bombers. Initial raids failed to hit the destroyer, but when Soviet smoke screens were lifted at 06:40 after German tanks attacked under their cover she moved to Korabelnaya Bay, where she was moored at the wharf. At 8:00 the German air attacks resumed, this time composed of Junkers Ju 87 dive bombers, whose bombs exploded much closer to Svobodny, inflicting casualties from fragments. About two and a half hours later, her hull was holed by near misses.

At 13:15, the destroyer was attacked from multiple directions by an entire gruppe of Ju 87s, whose bombs scored nine direct hits, which started massive fires that detonated anti-aircraft ammunition. Sixty-seven crewmen were killed and many wounded, with her captain among the latter. The survivors abandoned ship just before her torpedoes and aft magazine exploded. Svobodny sank with a 50° list, with the forward superstructure unsubmerged; the latter burned for three days. One hundred and one survivors were returned to the Caucasus aboard the cruiser  three days later. Svobodny was struck from the Soviet Navy on 24 June. The wreck was raised by the Emergency Rescue Service of the Black Sea Fleet and scrapped at the Sevastopol Glavvtorchermet base in Inkerman during early 1953.

Citations

Sources

Further reading

External links 

 Svobodny photographs

Storozhevoy-class destroyers
1939 ships
Ships built at Shipyard named after 61 Communards
Destroyers sunk by aircraft
Ships sunk by German aircraft
World War II shipwrecks in the Black Sea
Naval magazine explosions